Annayya is a 2000 Indian Telugu-language film directed by Muthyala Subbaiah who wrote the film with Bhupati Raja and Satyanand. The film stars Chiranjeevi, Soundarya, Ravi Teja, Venkat, Chandni, Sishwa, Priya and  Kota Srinivasa Rao. It has music composed by Mani Sharma with cinematography by Chota K. Naidu. The film is released on 7 January 2000.

The film won three state Nandi Awards. The film was remade in Bengali as Devdoot (2005). It was later dubbed into Tamil as Moothavan.

Plot

Rajaram, owner of a fleet of lorrie, meets Devi, a garment factory owner. After that acquaintance, she once seeks his help in dealing with two street ruffians, who were teasing her sisters, Lata and Geetha, and is shocked when the culprits turn out to be his brothers, Ravi and Gopi. Rajaram takes the incident lightly as the pranks of youngsters and is very lenient with them. With more such incidents, the two fall in love, with the brothers and sisters not far behind.

On his brothers' request, Rajaram approaches Devi for her sisters' hands in marriage to his brothers. But she curtly refuses her consent on grounds that the two are wayward drunkards. Rajaram reacts sharply to it and vows to get his brothers married to her sisters.

Since then on he is more exacting with his brothers and brings about a transformation in them. Devi agrees to their marriage. But the incorrigible brothers come in an inebriated condition for their engagement and Rajaram faces the brunt of Devi's ire. She insults him and leaves with her sisters. An outraged Rajaram kicks his brothers out of home.

The two brothers being state rank holders in engineering find favor with a businessman, Rangarao, who employs them. Rajaram, who is genuinely fond of his brothers, sells away his property and gives money secretly to Rangarao, paving the way for a partnership deal between Rangarao and his brothers. Piqued at being kicked out of home, his brothers, unaware of his hand in securing the partnership for them, nurse a grudge against their brother and insult Rajaram in Devi's presence. She, being in the know, slaps them and opens their eyes by informing them of his sacrifice. This brings about a total change in them and the repentant duo go to Rangarao to restore the property to their brother.

Rangarao has other plans and tries to have them killed with gundas. The brothers escape death and land in a hospital with injuries. A furious Rajaram goes to Rangarao, who reveals his real identity. Rangarao is the brother of Chinna Rao, a criminal who was caught in the police dragnet with Rajaram's help and later died. This is Rangarao's vendetta. In the ensuing melee, Rangarao is killed. Rajaram and his brothers reunite.

The film ends with all the three brothers getting married; Rajaram with Devi, Ravi with Latha, and Gopi with Geetha.

Cast

Soundtrack

Mani Sharma composed the songs, while Veturi, Bhuvanachandra, Jonnavittula and Vennelakanti penned the lyrics. The track "Hima Seemallo", sung by Hariharan and Harini  won the Nandi Award for Best Playback Singer, Male for Hariharan.

Telugu tracklist 
Annayya (Telugu Version)

Tamil Tracklist 
Moothavan (Tamil Version)

Box office 
The film had collected a distributors' share of Rs.11 crores. It completed 50 days in 92 centres and 100 days in 60 centres.

Awards 
Nandi awards 2000

 Best Male Playback Singer - Hariharan for "Hima Seemallo" - won
 Best Choreographer - Raghava Lawrence for "Aata Kaavala" - won
 Best Fight Master - Kanal Kannan - won

References

External links
 

2000 films
Geetha Arts films
Films scored by Mani Sharma
2000s Telugu-language films
Telugu films remade in other languages
Indian comedy-drama films
Films directed by Muthyala Subbaiah
2000 comedy-drama films